Gavin Richard Moffat (born 7 September 1972) is an English former first-class cricketer.

Moffat was born at Morecambe in September 1972. He was educated at Lancaster Royal Grammar School, before matriculating to Durham University. From there he proceeded to Homerton College at the University of Cambridge. While studying at Cambridge, he played first-class cricket for Cambridge University Cricket Club in 1998, making five appearances. Playing as a medium pace bowler in the Cambridge side, he took 8 wickets, but struggled against county opposition, which is reflected by his bowling average of 98.50. His best bowling figures were 2 for 50. As a lower order batsman, he scored 45 runs with a highest score of 27. After graduating from Cambridge, Moffat began a career in education and is a languages teacher at Stowe School. His brother, Philip, was also a first-class cricketer.

References

External links

1972 births
Living people
People from Morecambe
People educated at Lancaster Royal Grammar School
Alumni of Homerton College, Cambridge
English cricketers
Cambridge University cricketers
Schoolteachers from Lancashire
Alumni of Hatfield College, Durham